The 2021 AFA Senior Male League is the 21st season of the AFA Senior Male League, the men's football league in Anguilla. The season began on March 12, 2021.

Teams

Stadiums and locations 
Note: Table lists in alphabetical order.

Table

References

External links 
 2021 AFA Senior Male League at RSSSF

2020
2020–21 in Caribbean football leagues
2021–22 in Caribbean football leagues